Iazamir "Zamir" Gotta (Russian: Язамир Готта) is a Russian producer and broadcaster. He is best known as the travelling companion of American chef Anthony Bourdain in his Travel Channel TV show Anthony Bourdain: No Reservations, when they traveled to Uzbekistan, Russia and Romania and later in the U.S. Rust Belt, Ukraine, and Kansas City. Gotta also accompanied Bourdain in Batumi, during Bourdain's subsequent series, Parts Unknown.  The two originally met during a two-part episode in Saint Petersburg, Russia for Bourdain's earlier series, A Cook's Tour which aired on the Food Network in 2002.

Gotta received his education from the Moscow State Pedagogical University (majoring in English). He worked as an instructor for military interpreters until the 1990s. During the Ukraine show, first aired in August, 2011, Gotta revealed that his heritage is a mix of Turkic (Tatar) and Jewish from the Crimea.
  
Gotta started as a freelance film producer, working on American film productions in Russia. Since 2006 he has been a consultant at the Trident Media Group in New York City. He was associate producer for the episode of the American documentary television series Cities of the Underworld titled "Stalin's Secret Lair," which first aired on the History Channel in 2008. He was also an associate producer for the Nova TV series documentary titled "Astrospies" (2008).

Anthony Bourdain: A Cook's Tour
Zamir first appeared in Bourdain's show, A Cook's Tour in two episodes:
 The Cook Who Came In From the Cold
 So Much Vodka, So Little Time

Anthony Bourdain: No Reservations
Gotta continued to work with Bourdain in his second series, No Reservations.

 Uzbekistan: first aired, Travel Channel, October 24, 2005
 Russia: first aired, Travel Channel, January 29, 2007
 Romania: first aired, Travel Channel, February 25, 2008
 Rust Belt (Baltimore, Maryland; Detroit, Michigan; Buffalo, New York): first aired, Travel Channel, July 27, 2009
 Ukraine: first aired, Travel Channel, August 15, 2011
 Kansas City: first aired, Travel Channel, April 16, 2012
 Brooklyn, NY: first aired, Travel Channel, November 5, 2012

Anthony Bourdain: Parts Unknown
Gotta re-joined Bourdain in episodes of his new series, Parts Unknown.

 Season 3, Episode 5: "Russia"
 Season 7, Episode 5: "Tbilisi, Georgia"

References

External links

Living people
Crimean Tatar people
Russian film producers
Russian Jews
1957 births